Dale Joseph Melczek (November 9, 1938 – August 25, 2022) was an American prelate of the Roman Catholic Church.  He served as an auxiliary bishop of the Archdiocese of Detroit in Michigan from 1982 to 1992 and as bishop of the Diocese of Gary in Indiana from 1996 until 2014.

Biography

Early years 
Dale Melczek was born in Detroit, Michigan, and studied at St. Mary's College in Orchard Lake Village, Michigan.  He then attended St. John's Provincial Seminary in Plymouth, Michigan, where he was awarded a Master of Divinity degree. Melczek earned a Master of Education degree from the University of Detroit, and did his postgraduate work at the University of Notre Dame.

Priesthood 
Melczek was ordained to the priesthood for the Archdiocese of Detroit by Archbishop John Dearden on June 6, 1964. After his ordination, Melczek was assigned as associate pastor at St. Sylvester Parish in Warren, Michigan, serving there for the next six years.  In 1970, he was named as co-pastor of St. Christine Parish in Detroit, becoming pastor in 1972.  He also started serving as vicar of the West Detroit Vicariate in 1973. He served as assistant vicar for parishes from 1975 to 1977, when he became priest-secretary to Cardinal John Dearden and vicar general of the archdiocese.

Auxiliary bishop of Detroit 
On December 3, 1982, Pope John Paul II appointed Melczek as an auxiliary bishop of the Archdiocese of Detroit and titular bishop of Tragurium. He received his episcopal consecration on January 27, 1983, from Archbishop Edmund Szoka, with Bishops Harold Perry and Arthur Krawczak serving as co-consecrators.

As an auxiliary bishop, Melczek served as episcopal vicar of the Detroit Northwest Region.  In 1987, he coordinated Pope John Paul II's visit to Detroit.

Bishop of Gary 
On August 19, 1992. Melczek was named apostolic administrator of the Diocese of Gary and on October 28, 1995, the coadjutor bishop of Gary. John Paul II appointed Melczek as the third bishop of Gary on June 1, 1996.

In November 1996, Melczek was elected to the board of Catholic Relief Services. In 1997 Melczek visited the Philippines and in 1998 Myanmar and Cambodia.  In the summer of 1999, he went to Indonesia and East Timor. Melczek visited  the Democratic Republic of Congo and the Republic of the Congo in 2001,  then Angola and Tanzania in 2003.

Melczek also served as chairman of the United States Conference of Catholic Bishops (USCCB) Committee on the Laity (2002–2005), co-chairman of the Race Relations Council of Northwest Indiana (2002–2007), and episcopal liaison to the National Association of Catholic Chaplains (2002–2007).

In 2003, Melczek petitioned Cardinal Joseph Ratzinger to remove Richard Emerson from the priesthood. Emerson first served in the Diocese of Gary starting in 1978, then moved in 1986 to the Diocese of Orlando as a temporary assignment close to his parents.  In 1991, Orlando Bishop Norbert Dorsey requested Emerson's transfer back to Gary, where Emerson resumed ministry.  Multiple allegations of inappropriate behavior were generated from Emerson's assignments in Florida and Indiana. On December 22, 2003, Melczek removed Monsignor Don Grass from ministry after he admitted sexually abusing a minor.  It happened while Grass was assigned to Cathedral of the Holy Angels Parish in Gary during the late 1960's.

On January 15, 2005, Melczek and the Diocese of Gary were named in a lawsuit by an Orlando man. The plaintiff stated that Emerson had sexually abused him as a minor during the late 1980s and early 1990s when Emerson was posted at St. Charles Borromeo Parish in Orlando.  The lawsuit claimed that the Diocese of Gary and Melczek ignored earlier sexual abuse allegations against Emerson during his first stay in Indiana. At his request, Emerson was removed from the priesthood in 2006. On July 7, 2010, Melczek and the diocese of Gary were sued again, based on allegations by a different man in Orlando against Emerson.

Retirement 
On November 9, 2013, Melczek turned 75, the age at which Catholic bishops must submit their resignations to the Pope.  On November 24, 2014, Pope Francis accepted Melczek's resignation, replacing him with Auxiliary Bishop Donald J. Hying. Melczek served as apostolic administrator until Hying's installation in January 2015.  He also served as administrator of St. Mary of the Lake Parish in Gary.

On August 24, 2022, it was reported that Melczek was in hospice care in Gary after suffering a stroke that left him unresponsive. Melczek died on August 25, 2022.

See also
 Catholic Church hierarchy
 Catholic Church in the United States
 Historical list of the Catholic bishops of the United States
 List of Catholic bishops of the United States
 Lists of patriarchs, archbishops, and bishops

References

External links
Roman Catholic Diocese of Gary Official Site

 

1938 births
2022 deaths
20th-century Roman Catholic bishops in the United States
21st-century Roman Catholic bishops in the United States
Bishops appointed by Pope John Paul II
American people of Polish descent
Clergy from Detroit
Religious leaders from Michigan
Roman Catholic Archdiocese of Detroit
Roman Catholic bishops of Gary
University of Detroit Mercy alumni